The 2019 Auburn Tigers football team represented Auburn University in the 2019 NCAA Division I FBS football season. The Tigers played their home games at Jordan–Hare Stadium in Auburn, Alabama, and competed in the Western Division of the Southeastern Conference (SEC). They were led by seventh-year head coach Gus Malzahn.

Previous season
The Tigers finished the 2018 season 8–5, 3–5. They were invited to the Music City Bowl where they defeated Purdue 63–14 to become the Music City Bowl champions.

Offseason

Position key

Offseason departures
Three Auburn players with remaining eligibility declared early for the 2019 NFL Draft. In addition, 17 seniors from the 2018 team graduated.

Recruits
The Tigers signed a total of 21 recruits.

Returning starters

Offense

Defense

Special teams

Spring game
The A-Day spring game was held on Saturday, April 13. The Orange Team (first team) defeated the Blue Team (second team) 28–10. Both quarterbacks competing for the starting position, Bo Nix and Joey Gatewood, had strong performances. Wide receiver Seth Williams was named Offensive MVP, Derrick Brown was named Defensive MVP, and Anders Carlson was named Special Teams MVP.

Preseason

Award watch lists 
Listed in the order that they were released

SEC media poll
The SEC media poll was released on July 19, 2019 with the Tigers predicted to finish in fourth place in the West Division.

Preseason All-SEC teams
The Tigers had eight players selected to the preseason all-SEC teams.

Offense

1st team

Prince Tega Wanogho – OL

3rd team

JaTarvious Whitlow – RB

Defense

1st team

Derrick Brown – DL

2nd team

Nick Coe – DL

Marlon Davidson – DL

3rd team

Daniel Thomas - DB

Specialists

2nd team

Anders Carlson - K

3rd team

Arryn Siposs - P

Schedule

Schedule Source:

Personnel

Coaching staff

Game summaries

vs. Oregon

Tulane

Kent State

at Texas A&M

Mississippi State

at Florida

at Arkansas

at LSU

Ole Miss

Georgia

Samford

Alabama

vs. Minnesota

Rankings

Awards and honors

Players drafted into the NFL

References

Auburn
Auburn Tigers football seasons
Auburn Tigers football